Gwinn is an unincorporated community in Marquette County in the U.S. state of Michigan.  It is a census-designated place (CDP) for statistical purposes and has no legal status as an incorporated municipality.  The population of the CDP was 1,784 at the 2020 census.  The community is located within Forsyth Township.

The CDP includes the nearby communities of Austin to the west and New Swanzy to the east.  It is located along M-35 near the forks of the east and middle branches of the Escanaba River.   The Gwinn 49841 ZIP Code serves a much larger area, including most of Forsyth Township, as well as portions of Turin Township to the east, Wells and Ewing townships to the south, Tilden Township to the west, Richmond, Sands, West Branch, and Chocolay townships to the north.

History 

The area was acquired by the Cleveland-Cliffs Iron Company (CCI) in 1902, which opened the Gwinn Mine in 1905.  In 1906, the president of CCI, William Gwinn Mather, commissioned the well-known Boston landscape designer, Warren H. Manning to design a residential community to support the mining operations. Mather named the community after his mother Elizabeth Lucy Gwinn. Streets were laid out and ground was broken for the first houses in 1907.  Construction was primarily carried out between then and 1915.  Manning emphasized Gwinn's connection to the surrounding environment by preserving many of the existing trees and planting new ones.  Eventually, over 8 percent of the cost of the town's construction was allocated to outdoor improvements.

The community became known as a "Model Town", a trace of which remains in the name for the local high school sports teams: the "Modeltowners". It received a Post Office in 1908. Although it began as a company town, the direct involvement of Cleveland-Cliffs in the affairs of the Gwinn gradually decreased, and by the Great Depression the company had no hand in the operation of the town.  Cleveland-Cliffs began divesting itself of real estate in the town, and by 1946 had sold the last of the houses it owned. The nearby Austin Mine was also operated by Cleveland-Cliffs, which developed the Austin community in 1911 to provide residences for miners and their families. Similarly, New Swanzy took its name from the Swanzy Iron Company, formed in 1883. The original Swanzy, located further to the northeast in Forsyth Township, was the site of the Escanaba River Land & Iron Company. Swanzy was a station on the Chicago & Northwestern Railroad and had a post office from October 1889 until December 1905.

On June 24, 2002, Gwinn was listed in the National Register of Historic Places as the "Gwinn Model Town Historic District, Forsyth Township, Marquette County, Michigan".  The historic district encompasses the sections of Gwinn that were platted during the time Cleveland Cliffs was involved in the town's affairs.  Although the original Manning Plan for the town was never fully implemented, the section of town that was platted remains faithful to the Manning plan.

In 2015 it was rated by Business Insider as the most affordable town in Michigan.

Geography

Renovation
Recently Gwinn has experienced a boom of renovation and restoration taking place in the downtown area. Using federal funds the city has been beautified. Additional community funding has paid for the Community Clubhouse to have a complete exterior masonry restoration.

Demographics

As of the census of 2000, there were 1,965 people, 851 households, and 584 families residing in the CDP. The racial makeup of the CDP was 94.86% White, 0.92% African American, 1.48% Native American, 1.02% Asian, 0.36% from other races, and 1.37% from two or more races. Hispanic or Latino of any race were 0.92% of the population.

There were 851 households, out of which 29.1% had children under the age of 18 living with them, 54.2% were married couples living together, 9.5% had a female householder with no husband present, and 31.3% were non-families. 28.4% of all households were made up of individuals, and 11.0% had someone living alone who was 65 years of age or older.  The average household size was 2.31 and the average family size was 2.80.

In the CDP, the population was spread out, with 21.9% under the age of 18, 7.8% from 18 to 24, 25.6% from 25 to 44, 29.2% from 45 to 64, and 15.4% who were 65 years of age or older.  The median age was 42 years. For every 100 females, there were 97.1 males.  For every 100 females age 18 and over, there were 93.0 males.

The median income for a household in the CDP was $30,772, and the median income for a family was $41,250. Males had a median income of $35,962 versus $18,929 for females. The per capita income for the CDP was $16,511.  About 12.0% of families and 17.3% of the population were below the poverty line, including 31.4% of those under age 18 and 8.5% of those age 65 or over.

Transportation
Indian Trails bus lines operates daily intercity bus service between Hancock and Milwaukee with a stop in Gwinn.

Notable people
 Bonita Pietila, casting director for The Simpsons
 Shadi Petosky, television writer
 Mike Shaw, professional WCW wrestler known as Norman The Lunatic

References

External links
Gwinn Sawyer Chamber of Commerce
Gwinn Area Web Site
Gwinn Area Community Schools

Unincorporated communities in Marquette County, Michigan
Unincorporated communities in Michigan
Census-designated places in Michigan
Census-designated places in Marquette County, Michigan
Planned communities in the United States
Company towns in Michigan
Historic districts on the National Register of Historic Places in Michigan
Populated places established in 1907
1907 establishments in Michigan
National Register of Historic Places in Marquette County, Michigan